Michael Stuckmann (born 1 September 1979) is a German former professional footballer who played as a defender.

Club career
Born in Bochum, Stuckmann began his career with Rot-Weiß Markania Bochum before joining the youth team of the local rival VfL Bochum. After a successful season with VfL Bochum he signed in summer 1998 with the city rival SG Wattenscheid 09 and earned four caps in his first season in the 2. Bundesliga. He played six seasons for SG Wattenscheid 09 making 120 appearances. In July 2004, and after the relegation of SG Wattenscheid 09, he signed for the newly promoted Regionalliga club Wuppertaler SV Borussia. Stuckmann was one of the best players in the Wuppertaler SV Borussia over the years and left the team after 168 games to sign for the Swiss Super League relegated club FC Vaduz, who was named in the course of the season from head coach Pierre Littbarski as the new captain of the team.

International career
Stuckmann earned 15 caps and scored two goals for the German under-20.

References

External links
 

1979 births
Living people
Sportspeople from Bochum
German footballers
Footballers from North Rhine-Westphalia
Association football defenders
Germany youth international footballers
2. Bundesliga players
3. Liga players
Regionalliga players
Swiss Challenge League players
FC Vaduz players
SG Wattenscheid 09 players
Wuppertaler SV players
Borussia Mönchengladbach II players
German expatriate footballers
German expatriate sportspeople in Liechtenstein
Expatriate footballers in Liechtenstein